The 2013–14 Greek A2 Basket League was the 28th season of the Greek A2 Basket League, the second tier level professional club basketball league in Greece. The league finished on 10 May 2014. The winner was AEK Athens. The teams that were promoted to the first tier Greek Basket League were AEK Athens and Koroivos Amaliada. In contrast, the teams that were relegated to the third tier Greek C Basket League were Filathlitikos Zografou, Ikaroi Serron, and KAP Agia Paraskevi.

Previous 2012–13 season's results

Promoted to Greek Basket League
AENK (Champion of Greek A2 League)
Trikala (2nd place of Greek A2 League)
Relegated from Greek Basket League 
Peristeri (13th place) (Not played, relegated directly to B National) 
Kavala (14th place)
Promoted from Greek B Basket League
Psychiko (1st place – A Group)
Filippos Veroias (1st place – B Group)
AEK Athens (2nd place – A Group)
Iraklis Thessaloniki (2nd place – B Group) (replaced Peristeri )
Relegated to Greek B Basket League
Niki Volou (12th place)
Irakleio OAA (13th place)
Doxa Lefkadas (14th place)

Season standings

League table

See also
2013–14 Greek Basket League (1st tier)

References

External links
Greek A2 Basketball League
Greek Basketball Federation A2 National League Standings and Results 
Sentragoal.gr Results of A2 National League 
Sentragoal.gr Standings of A2 National League 
Onsports.gr A2 National League Standings 

Greek A2 Basket League
Greek
2